The Agyriales are an order of fungi in the class Lecanoromycetes.  It contains the following families: Agyriaceae,Anamylopsoraceae and Schaereriaceae.  Many of these fungi form lichens.

In 2001, rRNA gene sequences of Anamylopsora pulcherrima (Anamylopsoraceae), Placopsis gelida, Trapelia involuta and Trapelia placodioides (Agyriaceae) showed that the Agyriineae family was outside the Lecanorales order (where it had been placed) and the study suggested a sister group relationship to Ostropales/Pertusariales orders.

They were once thought to be a synonym of Pertusariales, until 2020 who re-established the order.

References

Lichen orders
Lecanoromycetes orders
Taxa described in 1931